The 1982 IAAF World Cross Country Championships was held in Rome, Italy, at the Ippodromo delle Capannelle on March 21, 1982.   A report on the event was given in the Glasgow Herald.

Complete results for men, junior men, women, medallists, 
 and the results of British athletes were published.  In the senior men's competition, two-time defending champion Craig Virgin had traveled to Rome to defend his title, but was unable to race.  On the day before the contest, was sent to the hospital by ambulance, where he was hospitalized for six days with a swollen kidney and a massive urinary tract infection.  Doctors ultimately decided against removal of Virgin's right kidney, although the kidney was later removed in 1994.

Medallists

Race results

Senior men's race (11.978 km)

Note: Athletes in parentheses did not score for the team result

Junior men's race (7.926 km)

Note: Athletes in parentheses did not score for the team result

Senior women's race (4.663 km)

Note: Athletes in parentheses did not score for the team result

Medal table (unofficial)

Note: Totals include both individual and team medals, with medals in the team competition counting as one medal.

Participation
An unofficial count yields the participation of 382 athletes from 33 countries.  This is in agreement with the official numbers as published.

 (20)
 (1)
 (19)
 (21)
 (2)
 (16)
 (3)
 (21)
 (14)
 (21)
 (20)
 (3)
 (20)
 (9)
 (1)
 (2)
 (1)
 (6)
 (6)
 (4)
 (11)
 (4)
 (6)
 (21)
 (2)
 (21)
 (17)
 (21)
 (15)
 (6)
 (21)
 (20)
 (7)

See also
 1982 IAAF World Cross Country Championships – Senior men's race
 1982 IAAF World Cross Country Championships – Junior men's race
 1982 IAAF World Cross Country Championships – Senior women's race
 1982 in athletics (track and field)

References

External links 
The World Cross Country Championships 1973-2005
GBRathletics
Athletics Australia

 
World Athletics Cross Country Championships
C
C
Sports competitions in Rome
International athletics competitions hosted by Italy
Cross country running in Italy
1980s in Rome
March 1982 sports events in Europe
Athletics in Rome